Fall River is a city in Bristol County, Massachusetts, United States. Fall River's population was 94,000 at the 2020 United States census, making it the tenth-largest city in the state.

Located along the eastern shore of Mount Hope Bay at the mouth of the Taunton River, the city gained recognition during the 19th century as a leading textile manufacturing center in the United States. While the textile industry has long since moved on, its impact on the city's culture and landscape is still prominent. Fall River's official motto is "We'll Try", dating back to the aftermath of the Great Fire of 1843. Nicknamed The Scholarship City after Irving Fradkin founded Dollars for Scholars there in 1958, mayor Jasiel Correia introduced the "Make It Here" slogan as part of a citywide rebranding effort in 2017.

Fall River is known for the Lizzie Borden case, the Fall River cult murders, Portuguese culture, its numerous 19th-century textile mills and Battleship Cove, home of the world's largest collection of World War II naval vessels (including the battleship ). Fall River has its city hall located over an interstate highway.

History

Colonial period to 1800s

At the time of the establishment of the Plymouth Colony in 1620, the area that would one day become Troy City was inhabited by the Pokanoket Wampanoag tribe, headquartered at Mount Hope in what is now Bristol, Rhode Island. The "falling" river that the city's name refers to is the Quequechan River (pronounced "quick-a-shan" by locals) which flows through the city before draining into the bay. Quequechan is a Wampanoag word believed to mean "falling river" or "leaping/falling waters." During the 1960s, Interstate 195 was constructed through the city along the length of the Quequechan River. The portion west of Plymouth Avenue was routed underground through a series of box culverts, while much of the eastern section "mill pond" was filled in for the highway embankment.

In 1653, Freetown was settled at Assonet Bay by members of the Massachusetts Bay Colony as part of Freeman's Purchase, which included the northern part of what is now Fall River. In 1683, Freetown was incorporated as a town within the colony. The southern part of what is now Fall River was incorporated as the town of Tiverton as part of the Massachusetts Bay Colony in 1694, a few years after the merger with Plymouth Colony. In 1746, in the settlement of a colonial boundary dispute between Rhode Island and Massachusetts, Tiverton was annexed to Rhode Island, along with Little Compton and what is now Newport County, Rhode Island. The boundary was then placed approximately at what is now Columbia Street.

In 1703, Benjamin Church, a hero of King Philip's War established a saw mill, grist mill, and a fulling mill on the Quequechan River. In 1714, Church sold his land, along with the water rights to Richard Borden of Tiverton and his brother Joseph. This transaction would prove to be extremely valuable 100 years later, helping to establish the Borden family as the leaders in the development of Fall River's textile industry.

During the 18th century, the area consisted mostly of small farms and relatively few inhabitants. In 1778, the Battle of Freetown, was fought here during the American Revolutionary War (1775–1783) after British raids badly damaged Bristol and Warren. The militia of Fall River, at that time known as Freetown, put up a stronger defense against a British force.

In 1803, Fall River was separated from Freetown and officially incorporated as its own town. A year later, Fall River changed its name to "Troy." The name "Troy" was used for 30 years and was officially changed back to Fall River on February 12, 1834. During this period, Fall River was governed by a three-member Board of Selectmen, until it became a City in 1854.

In 1835, The Fall River Female Anti Slavery Society was formed (one of the many anti slavery societies in New England) to promote abolition and to allow a women's space to conduct social activism. There was an initial group, which was wary of allowing free black full membership, so a second group (this one) was formed in response by Elizabeth Buffum Chace and her sisters, who were committed to allowing free black women membership. Sarah G. Buffman, a delegate from the group, was sent to the Anti-Slavery Convention of American Women in Philadelphia in 1838. Buffman signed all three of the statements that the convention's delegates agreed on.

In July 1843, the first great fire in Fall River's history destroyed much of the town center, including the Atheneum, which housed the Skeleton in Armor which had been discovered in a sand bank in 1832 near what is now the corner of Hartwell and Fifth Street.

During this time, the southern part of what is now Fall River (south of Columbia Street) remained part of Tiverton, Rhode Island. In 1856, the town of Tiverton, Rhode Island voted to split off its industrial northern section as Fall River, Rhode Island. In 1861, after decades of dispute, the United States Supreme Court moved the state boundary to what is now State Avenue, unifying both Fall Rivers as a city in Massachusetts (among other changes; see ).

Industrial development and prosperity

19th century
The early establishment of the textile industry in Fall River grew out of the developments made in nearby Rhode Island, beginning with Samuel Slater at Pawtucket, Rhode Island in 1793. In 1811, Col. Joseph Durfee, the Revolutionary War veteran and hero of the Battle of Freetown in 1778, built the Globe Manufactory, a spinning mill at the outlet of Cook Pond on Dwelly St. near what is now Globe Four Corners in the city's South End. (It was part of Tiverton, Rhode Island at the time.) While Durfee's mill itself was not particularly successful, its establishment marked the beginning of Fall River's time as a mill city.

The real development of Fall River's industry, however, would occur along the falling river from which it was named, about a mile north of Durfee's first mill. The Quequechan River, with its eight falls, combined to make Fall River the best tidewater privilege in southern New England. It was perfect for industrialization—big enough for profit and expansion, yet small enough to be developed by local capital without interference from Boston.

The Fall River Manufactory was established by David Anthony and others in 1813. That same year, the Troy Cotton & Woolen Manufactory was founded by a group of investors led by Oliver Chace of Swansea. Chase had worked as a carpenter for Samuel Slater in his early years. The Troy Mill opened in 1814 at the upper end of the falls.

In 1821, Colonel Richard Borden (along with Maj. Bradford Durfee) established the Fall River Iron Works at the lower part of the Quequechan River. Durfee was a shipwright, and Borden was the owner of a grist mill. After an uncertain start, in which some early investors pulled out, the Fall River Iron Works was incorporated in 1825. The Iron Works began producing nails, bar stock, and other items, such as bands for casks in the nearby New Bedford whaling industry. They soon gained a reputation for producing nails of high quality, and business flourished. In 1827, Col. Borden began regular steamship service to Providence, Rhode Island.

The American Print Works was established in 1835 by Holder Borden, uncle of Col. Richard Borden. With the leadership of the Borden family, the American Print Works (later known as the American Printing Company) became the largest and most important textile company in the city, employing thousands at its peak in the early 20th century. Richard Borden also constructed the Metacomet Mill in 1847, which today is the oldest remaining textile mill in the city; it is located on Anawan Street.

By 1845, the Quequechan's power had been all but maximized. The Massasoit Steam Mill was established in 1846, above the dam near the end of Pleasant Street. However, it would be another decade or so when improvements in the steam engine by George Corliss would enable the construction of the first large steam-powered mill in the city, the Union Mills in 1859.

The advantage of being able to import bales of cotton and coal to fuel the steam engines to Fall River's deep water harbor (and ship them out from the same) made Fall River the city of choice for a series of cotton mill magnates. The first railroad line serving Fall River, The Fall River Branch Railroad, was incorporated in 1844 and opened in 1845. In 1847, the first regular steamboat service to New York City began. The Fall River Line, as it came to be known, operated until 1937, and for many years was the preferred way to travel between Boston and Manhattan. The Old Colony Railroad and Fall River Railroad merged in 1854, forming the Old Colony and Fall River Railroad.

In 1854, Fall River was officially incorporated as a city; it had a population of about 12,000. Its first mayor was James Buffington.

Fall River profited well from the American Civil War and was in a fine position to take advantage of the prosperity that followed. By 1868, it had surpassed Lowell as the leading textile city in America with over 500,000 spindles.

Expansion and growth

In 1871 and 1872, a "most dramatic expansion" of the city occurred: 15 new corporations were founded, building 22 new mills throughout the city, while some of the older mills expanded. The city's population increased by 20,000 people during these two years, while overall mill capacity doubled to more than 1,000,000 spindles.

By 1876, the city had one-sixth of all New England cotton capacity and one-half of all print cloth production. The Spindle City, as it became known, was second in the world to only Manchester, England in terms of output.

To house the thousands of new workers—mostly Irish and French Canadian immigrants during these years—over 12,000 units of company housing were built. Unlike the well-spaced boardinghouses and tidy cottages of Rhode Island, worker housing in Fall River consisted of thousands of wood-framed, multi-family tenements, usually three-floor "triple-deckers" with up to six apartments. Many more privately owned tenements supplemented the company housing.

During the 19th century, Fall River became famous for the granite rock on which much of the city is built. Several granite quarries operated during this time, the largest of which was the Beattie Granite Quarry, near what is now the corner of North Quarry and Locust Streets. Many of the mills in the city were built from this stone, and it was highly regarded as a building material for many public buildings and private homes alike. The Chateau-sur-Mer mansion in Newport, Rhode Island was constructed from Fall River granite, known for its greyish-pink color.

While most of the mills "above the hill" were constructed from native Fall River granite, nearly all of their counterparts along the Taunton River and Mount Hope Bay were made of red brick due to the high costs and impracticality associated with transporting the rock through the city and down the hill. (One notable exception is the Sagamore Mills on North Main Street, which were constructed from similar rock quarried in Freetown and brought to the site by rail).

20th century

Fall River rode a wave of economic prosperity well into the early 20th century. During this time, the city boasted a bustling downtown with several upscale hotels and theaters. As the city continuously expanded during the late 19th century, additional infrastructure such as parks, schools, streetcar lines, a public water supply, and sewerage system were constructed to meet the needs of its growing population.

From 1896 to 1912, Fall River was the headquarters of the E. P. Charlton & Company, a chain of five and ten cent stores.  Founded at Fall River in 1890 by Seymour H. Knox and Earle Perry Charlton as the Knox & Charlton Five and Ten Cent Store, E.P. Charlton operated fifty-eight stores in the United States and Canada by the time of its merger with several other retailers to form the F. W. Woolworth Company in 1912.

In 1920, the population of Fall River peaked at 120,485.

The cotton mills of Fall River had built their business largely on one product: print cloth. Around 1910, the city's largest employer, the American Printing Company (APC), employed 6,000 people and was the largest company printer of cloth in the world. Dozens of other city mills solely produced cloth to be printed at the APC.

World War I had provided a general increase in demand for textiles, and many of the mills of New England benefited during this time. The post-war economy quickly slowed, however, and production quickly outpaced demand. The Northern mills faced serious competition from their Southern counterparts due to lower labor and transportation costs, as well as the South's large investment in new machinery and other equipment. In 1923, Fall River faced the first wave of mill closures. Several of the mills merged, allowing them to remain in business into the late 1920s.

The worst fire in Fall River's history occurred on the evening of February 2, 1928. It began when workers were dismantling the recently vacated Pocasset Mill. During the night, the fire spread quickly and wiped out a large portion of downtown. City Hall was spared, but was badly damaged. Today, many of the structures near the corner of North Main and Bedford Street date from the early 1930s, as they were rebuilt soon after the fire.

By the 1930s and the Great Depression, many of the mills were out of business and the city was bankrupt. The once mighty American Printing Company finally closed for good in 1934. In 1937, their huge plant waterfront on Water Street was acquired by the Firestone Tire & Rubber Company and soon employed 2,600 people. A handful managed to survive through World War II and into the 1950s. In October 1941, just a few weeks before the attack on Pearl Harbor, another large fire broke out in the main building of the printworks. The fire was a major setback to the U.S. war effort; 30,000 pounds (13,607 kilograms) of raw rubber worth $15 million was lost in the inferno.

With the demise of the textile industry, many of the city's mills were occupied by smaller companies, some in the garment industry, traditionally based in the New York City area but attracted to New England by the lure of cheap factory space and an eager workforce in need of jobs. The garment industry survived in the city well into the 1990s, by which point it had fallen victim to globalization and foreign competition.

Modern era

In the 1960s, the city's landscape was drastically transformed with the construction of the Braga Bridge and Interstate 195, which cut directly through the heart of the city. In the wake of the highway building boom, the city lost many of its longtime landmarks. The Quequechan River was filled in and re-routed for much of its length. The historic falls were diverted into underground culverts. A series of elevated steel viaducts was constructed to allow access the new bridge. Many historic buildings were demolished, including the Old City Hall, the Troy Mills, the Second Granite Block (built after the 1928 fire), as well as other 19th-century brick-and-mortar buildings near Old City Hall.

Constructed directly over Interstate 195 in the place of it predecessor, the new city hall (known as Government Center) was opened in 1976 after years of construction delays and quality control problems. Built in the Brutalist style popular in the 1960s and 1970s, the new city hall drew complaints from city workers and residents almost immediately.

In 1970, Valle's Steak House opened one if its landmark restaurants on William S. Canning Boulevard in the city's South End. The steak house was popular with Fall River residents, but economic challenges caused the chain to close all of its restaurants in the 1980s.

Also during the 1970s, several modern apartment high-rise towers were built throughout the city, many part of the Fall River Housing Authority. There were two built near Milliken Boulevard, two on Pleasant Street in Flint Village, another on South Main Street, and in the north end off Robeson Street. Today, these high-rises mostly house the elderly.

In 1978, the city opened the new B.M.C. Durfee High School in the North End, replacing the historic Rock Street building that had become overcrowded and outdated for use as a high school. The "new" Durfee is one of the largest high schools in Massachusetts.

Since approximately 1980, there has been a considerable amount of new development in the North End of the city. A significant number of new single- and multi-family housing developments have been constructed, particularly along North Main Street.

In 2021, Fall River was ranked the 96th most dangerous city in the United States. It was also the third most dangerous city in Massachusetts and fourth most dangerous city in New England.

On January 20, 2019, a cannabis dispensary opened in Fall River, becoming only the sixth dispensary in Massachusetts and the first in Southeastern Massachusetts to open to anyone 21 years or older.

Geography

Water power from the Quequechan River and natural granite helped form and shape Fall River into the city it is today. The Quequechan River once flowed through downtown unrestricted, providing water power for the mills and, in the last  of its length, down a series of eight steep waterfalls falling  into the Taunton River at the head of the deep Mount Hope Bay. Fall River and surrounding areas are located in the northeastern coastal forests, which make up the temperate broadleaf and mixed forest biome.

Fall River was the only city on the East Coast of the United States to have had an exposed waterfall in part of its downtown area; it flowed less than  into a sheltered harbor at the edge of downtown.

The city lies on the eastern border of Mount Hope Bay, which begins at the mouth of the Taunton River starting south from the Charles M. Braga Jr. Memorial Bridge. From the summits of these hills, the terrain extends back in a comparatively level table-land, on which a large section of the city now stands.

The northern pond is the North Watuppa Pond, the city's main reservoir. The southern pond is the South Watuppa Pond. The narrow strip of land where the two ponds meet is known as The Narrows. East of the North Watuppa Pond is the Watuppa Reservation, which includes several thousand acres of forest-land for water supply protection that extends north into the Freetown-Fall River State Forest, and east to the Copicut Reservoir. Copicut Pond is located on the border of Dartmouth in North Dartmouth's Hixville section that borders Fall River. Copicut Hill, the highest point in Fall River, is located between North Watuppa Pond and the Copicut Reservoir.

The Quequechan River breaks out of its bed in the west part of the South Watuppa Pond, just west of The Narrows, and flows through the city (partially underground in conduits) where it falls to a channel leading to what is now Fall River Heritage State Park at Battleship Cove on the Taunton River. The Quequechan River originally flowed unconfined over an almost level course for more than a mile. In the last half-mile (800 m) of its progress it rushes down the hillside in a narrow, precipitous, rocky channel, creating the falls for which Fall River is named.

 

Originally an attractive feature of the landscape, the Quequechan has seldom been visible since it was covered over by cotton mills and the Bay Colony Railroad line in the 19th century. As the Quequechan became an underground feature of the industrial landscape, it also became a sewer. In the 20th century the mills were abandoned and some of them burned, exposing the falls once more. Because of highway construction in the 1960s, the waterfalls were buried under Interstate 195, which crosses the Taunton River at Battleship Cove. Plans exist to "daylight" the falls, restore or re-create them, and build a green belt with a bicycle path along the Quequechan River.

In the south end, Cook Pond, also formerly known as Laurel Lake, is located east of the Taunton River and west of the South Watuppa Pond. The area between the modern day Cook and South Watuppa Ponds, east of the Taunton River and north of Tiverton, Rhode Island, was once referred to as "Pocasset Swamp" during King Philip's War in 1675–1676.

Neighborhoods
The city is divided into two by I-195; downtown sits between them. The two sections of the city contain a number of distinct neighborhoods.

Northern Neighborhoods ("The North End"; North of I-195, extending to the city's northern border with Freetown, Massachusetts and western border with Dartmouth, Massachusetts)
 Waterfront/Battleship Cove (east of Route 79 to the edge of the Taunton River/Mount Hope Bay)
 The Highlands
 Lower Highlands (Bedford St, up High St to Prospect St)
 Upper Highlands (Prospect St along President Ave, up to Wilson Rd)
 Fall River Industrial Park ("Airport Road," area north of Wilson Rd bounded to the west by Route 24 and to the east by Riggenbach Rd)
 Fall River/Freetown State Forest
Southern Neighborhoods ("The South End"; South of I-195, extending to the city's southern border with Tiverton, RI)
 Flint Village ("The Flint")South and east of Bedford and Quarry Sts, respectively)
 Globe Village (Cook Pond, Broadway)
 Townsend Hill (South Main and Bay St Neighborhoods bordering Tiverton, R.I.)
 Maplewood

Parks
Fall River has 23 municipal parks and playgrounds, including three designed by landscape architect Frederick Law Olmsted. Fall River's more notable parks include:
 Kennedy Park (Olmsted, 1868): South Main Street, 54 acres, four tennis courts, three baseball fields, two basketball courts, softball field, skating pond, playground
 North Park  (Olmsted, 1901): President Avenue, 25 acres, two baseball fields, two basketball courts, playground, skating pond, skate park
 Ruggles Park (Olmsted, 1903): Locust Street, 9 acres, basketball court, playground, softball field
 Bicentennial Park: Davol Street, 2 acres, boat ramp
 Lafayette Park: Eastern Avenue, 11 acres, baseball field, basketball court, playground, swimming pool, tennis court, skate park
 Quequechan River Rail Trail: 2.5 mile Bike path from Britland Park and Rodman Street to Westport Line on Route 6

The city is also home to several Massachusetts state parks, including Fall River Heritage State Park and Freetown-Fall River State Forest.

Demographics

According to the U.S. Census of 2020, the population of Fall River is 94,000. The largest racial groups within the city were 87.2% (83.4% Non-Hispanic) White, 3.5%  African American, 2.5% Asian and 0.2% Native American and 7.4% Hispanic or Latino. 49% of residents are Luso American or have origins somewhere in the former Portuguese Empire. 37% of the population described themselves as being of Portuguese ancestry. The next largest groups by ancestry are French (12.4%) the original immigrants to largely populate Fall River until the Portuguese started immigrating to the area, Irish (8.9%), Cape Verdean (8.1%), English (6.0%), French Canadian (5.9%), Puerto Rican (4.5%), and Italian (3.6%).

Fall River and its surrounding communities form much of the Massachusetts portion of the Providence metropolitan area, which has an estimated population of 1,622,520.

In percentage terms, Fall River has the largest Portuguese American population in the United States. The exact percentage of the population they make up is disputed; a 2005 study by the University of Massachusetts Dartmouth estimated that 49.6% of city residents are Portuguese American, while other sources estimate that 43.9% are.

The city has 38,759 households and 23,558 families. Of the 38,759 households, 29.9% had children under the age of 18 living with them, 40.3% were married couples living together, 16.5% had a female householder with no husband present, and 39.2% were non-families. 34.2% of all households were made up of individuals, and 14.2% had someone living alone who was 65 years of age or older. The average household size was 2.32 and the average family size was 3.00.

In terms of age, the population was spread out, with 24.1% under the age of 18, 9.2% from 18 to 24, 29.8% from 25 to 44, 20.0% from 45 to 64, and 16.9% who were 65 years of age or older. The median age was 36 years. For every 100 females, there were 87.7 males. For every 100 females age 18 and over, there were 82.9 males.

The median household income was $29,014, and the median family income was $37,671. Males had a median income of $31,330 versus $22,883 for females. The per capita income for the city was $16,118. About 14.0% of families and 17.1% of the population were below the poverty line, including 25.4% of those under age 18 and 17.4% of those age 65 or over.

Income

Fall River is ranked 344th out of Massachusetts' 350 municipalities in terms of per capita income.

Culture

Fall River retains a vibrant mix of cultures that date back to its time as an immigration hub. While the distinct ethnic neighborhoods formed in the late 19th and early 20th centuries have changed over the years, the legacy of immigrants who came to work in the mills can be found in the various parishes and restaurants throughout the city. This heritage is commemorated by the 19 flags which make up the "Banners of Allegiance" at Gromada Plaza. Erected in 1979 across from City Hall (and restored in 2019), this landmark commemorates the diverse nationalities of Fall River's residents.

The city is host to many ethnic festivals throughout the year. The largest, the Great Holy Ghost Festival, occurs each August at Kennedy Park and attracts over 200,000 visitors. The feast is held over a total of four days.

Each summer, the city uses its waterfront at Heritage State Park and Battleship Cove for a Fourth of July fireworks display. For many years, the waterfront also hosted the annual Fall River Celebrates America Festival, sponsored by the Fall River Chamber of Commerce. The event was suspended in 2010 due to lack of financial support stemming from the Great Recession. While the Chamber of Commerce hoped to hold the event again in 2011, it has not been held since.

Performing arts 
A number of community organizations have made concerted efforts to promote the arts in the city, using vacant mill space for studios and performance centers. The Narrows Center for the Arts, located on Anawan Street, has been played by a number of national and international acts since its opening in 2001, including Rosanne Cash, Los Lobos, Blue Öyster Cult, Dr. John, The Avett Brothers, Richie Havens, Lake Street Dive and Susan Tedeschi. A proposal is in place to revitalize the downtown area by the creation of an Arts District. Along with the art centers being established throughout the city, Fall River has numerous Portuguese/Community Bands throughout the city that perform throughout the year.

Visual arts 
In 2020, artists and Fall River natives Harry Gould Harvey IV and Brittni Ann Harvey opened the Fall River Museum of Contemporary Art (Fall River MoCA) in the first floor of a former mill on Bedford Street. The museum aims to "create culturally relevant programming that is in dialog with the global contemporary art world."

Religion

Fall River remains a predominantly Roman Catholic city due to the French Canadians who first populated the city, and is the seat of the Roman Catholic Diocese of Fall River. St. Mary's Cathedral was formed in the 1850s by Irish immigrants; Edgar DaCunha has served as bishop since 2014. Santo Christo Parish on Columbia Street is known as the Mother Church of the Portuguese parishes in the diocese. The Church was established in 1892 to serve the local Portuguese community, Many of whom came from the Azorean island of São Miguel. Other notable Catholic churches include St. Anne's Church, Good Shepherd Church (formerly Saint Patrick's), and the former Notre Dame de Lourdes in the Flint neighborhood, which was destroyed in a large fire on May 10, 1982. At the time of the city's peak population in 1920, there were over two dozen Catholic parishes existing throughout the city, with each ethnic enclave having its own parish. In recent years, the diocese has merged several parishes in the city, closing some and renaming the united congregations, bringing the total number of parishes in the diocese to ten as of 2021. St. Louis the King Church closed in 2000.

Historically, the Highlands neighborhood was predominantly Protestant, with several churches in the area of North Main and Rock Streets, notably including the Central Congregational Church and the First Congregational Church, known for hosting many New England luminaries before its demise in a fire in the 1980s.

German Jewish settlers arrived in Fall River beginning in the 1860s and continuing into the 1870s. The 1880s and 1890s saw the arrival of Russian Jewish immigrants. At the start of the 20th century, Fall River was home to three synagogues. The Jewish community historically worked in peddling, retail, and clothing stores. Temple Beth-El was founded in 1924 on High Street. In 1970 there were three congregations serving 4,000 Jews in Fall River; by 2008 that number had declined to less than 1,000.

Various other ethno-religious groups also live in the city. Recent arrivals from Cambodia and India maintain temples in the city, such as Wat Udomsaharatanaram and BAPS Shri Swaminarayanwasi.

Government

City government and services

The city is led by the mayor-council form of government. There is a mayor and nine at-large city councillors, elected in odd-years to two year terms. The mayor, along with their appointed city administrator, lead and manage the city's day-to-day operations. The majority of the city's municipal offices are located at Government Center.

The city's police department is consolidated into a large central police station. There are six fire stations located around the city. The Fire Headquarters is located on Commerce Drive, across from the former Fall River Municipal Airport.

There are four post offices in the city. The central, located adjacent to Government Center, is modeled after the James Farley Post Office in New York City. The central branch was named after the late Sgt. Robert Barrett in May 2011, a Fall River native who died in Afghanistan in 2010. Additional branches are located in the Flint, the South End, and the Highlands.

The city is home to several state and county-level courthouses. The murder trial of former New England Patriots tight end Aaron Hernandez in 2015 was held at the district courthouse on South Main Street.

State and federal representation
Fall River is represented by three separate Massachusetts House of Representatives districts; only one, the 7th Bristol, is wholly within city limits. As of 2021, the city is represented by Democrats Carole Fiola (6th Bristol), Alan Silvia (7th Bristol), and Paul A. Schmid III (8th Bristol). The city is entirely within the First Bristol and Plymouth district, represented by State Senator Michael Rodrigues (D-Fall River). The First Bristol and Plymouth also includes the towns of Freetown, Lakeville, Rochester, Somerset and Swansea.

Fall River's state highways are patrolled by the Third Barracks of Troop D of the Massachusetts State Police, based out of Dartmouth.

On the national level, the city is divided between two congressional districts. Massachusetts' 4th congressional district, represented by Democrat Jake Auchincloss, contains most of the city, while Massachusetts' 9th congressional district, represented by Democrat Bill Keating, contains a part of the northeastern portion of the city.

Education

Public schools

Fall River Public Schools operates all public schools in the city. Fall River has one public high school, B.M.C. Durfee High School. Durfee alum include Chris Herren, former NBA player for the Denver Nuggets and the Boston Celtics, former Supreme Court Justice James M. McGuire, and Humberto Sousa Medeiros, a Cardinal of the Roman Catholic Church and former Archbishop of Boston.

The city is also home to Diman Regional Vocational Technical High School, which serves Fall River and the towns of Somerset, Swansea, and Westport. Chef Emeril Lagasse is a Diman Graduate. The school dates back to the Durfee Textile School, which branched out to include Diman. (The college, founded to promote the city's textile sciences, is now a part of University of Massachusetts Dartmouth.)

Private schools
In addition to public schools, there are several private and parochial schools in the city, including six Catholic schools, two private schools, a Christian academy (East Gate Christian Academy). Atlantis Charter School, a Pre-K through 8 charter school with a marine science-themed curriculum, was founded in 1995. The city is also home to Bishop Connolly High School, a Catholic high school named for Bishop James Louis Connolly, fourth Bishop of the Diocese of Fall River. Bishop Feehan was located in Fall River from 1961 to 1972.

Espirito Santo School opened on September 19, 1910, and was the first Portuguese grammar school to open in the United States. As of 2011, the majority of its students were ethnic Portuguese, and 70% of the students were bilingual.

Higher education
University of Massachusetts Dartmouth has two branches in the city: the Professional and Continuing Education Center, located at 139 South Main Street, and the Advanced Technical & Manufacturing Center at the Narrows, on the former site of the Kerr Mills. Bristol Community College, founded in 1965, is a two-year college offering associate degrees as well transfer programs to four-year institutions. Eastern Nazarene College offers Adult Studies/LEAD classes in Fall River as well. It has GED programs and a recording studio.

Sister cities
Fall River is twinned with:
  Ponta Delgada, The Azores – Portugal

Library

Fall River established its public library in 1860. As of fiscal year 2022, the city of Fall River spends 0.53% ($1,861,112) of its budget on its public library—roughly $20 per person.

The main location of the Fall River Public Library is located at 104 North Main Street, within the Downtown Fall River Historic District. It opened in 1899, and was designed by architect Ralph Adams Cram in the Renaissance Revival style. It is constructed from native Fall River granite. The building underwent an extensive renovation during the late 1990s and early 2000s.

The public library system also includes two branches; the South End Branch, located at 58 Arch Street, and the East End Branch, located at 1386 Pleasant Street.

The Fall River Historical Society also maintains the Charlton Library of Fall River History.

Transportation

Fall River has historically been a transportation hub for the South Coast and Mount Hope Bay areas due to its location along the Taunton River. In addition to the Fall River Line, Slade's Ferry ran from Fall River to Somerset beginning in the 17th century. In 1875, Slade's Ferry Bridge was opened, connecting the two cities by trolley (and late by car). The bridge was in use until 1970, when it was closed and subsequently demolished. The path of the bridge is now roughly marked by twin sets of power lines crossing the river.

Closed in 2011 and inaccessible to pedestrians and vehicles, the old span is still partially standing. By the 1980s, structural issues with the Brightman Street Bridge resulted in frequent closures for repair, straining local traffic and forcing motorists to take long detours. Plans were put on hold in 1989 due to Coast Guard concerns. Construction of the new span began in the late 1990s and continued until late 2011. The new bridge, the Veterans Memorial Bridge, was formally dedicated on September 11, 2011.

Construction on the Charles M. Braga Jr. Memorial Bridge began in 1959, and the bridge opened to traffic in the spring of 1966. The six-lane cantilever truss highway bridge spans  and was constructed in tandem with Interstate 195. The bridge is named for Charles M. Braga Jr., who died during the attack on Pearl Harbor while aboard the U.S.S. Pennsylvania.

Major highways

Interstate 195 is the main east-west artery through the city for motorists. The highway enters Fall River from the west via the Charles M. Braga Jr. Memorial Bridge, continuing through the center of the city to The Narrows and New Bedford and Cape Cod to the east. The highway roughly parallels both the Bay Colony/New Bedford Cape Cod Railroad as well the original path of the Quequechan River. In 1999, a cement ceiling tile fell from the roof of the tunnel beneath Government Center, landing on several cars and causing minor injuries. The incident caused major traffic problems in the area, and is reminiscent of the I-90 tunnel collapse (a part of the Big Dig) in Boston in 2006.

In addition to Interstate 195, Fall River is served by four other major routes. U.S. Route 6 passes over the Brightman Street Bridge headed east, before joining the city street grid and continuing into Westport as State Road. Route 24, a two lane, north-south expressway, enters the city (and the state) at its southern border and extends towards the city center, where it is briefly concurrent with Interstate 195 before branching north along the city's eastern border towards Taunton, Brockton and the Southeast Expressway into Boston. Route 79, another north-south divided highway, begins at the Braga Bridge and continues northbound along the city's waterfront to Airport Road, where it becomes concurrent with Route 24. Route 138 enters the city via the Veterans Memorial Bridge before joining the city grid and headed south towards Tiverton and Aquidneck Island. Route 81 begins in the heart of the city and heads south along city streets into Tiverton. Route 138, Route 24, I-195, and US 6 are based upon pre-Colonial and Colonial-era Native American trails.

Rail
Fall River last saw passenger rail service in 1958. An under-construction project named South Coast Rail will bring MBTA Commuter Rail service to a currently under-construction station serving the city via a slight rerouting/extension of the existing Middleborough/Lakeville Line as an interim service by 2023. The line is eventually planned to be rerouted via the Stoughton Branch and the former Dighton and Somerset Railroad by 2030. As of 2022, the nearest passenger rail station is Providence, which is served by the MBTA Providence/Stoughton line and Amtrak's Acela Express and Northeast Regional trains.

Bus
Along with New Bedford, Fall River shares ownership of the Southeastern Regional Transit Authority (SRTA), a bus network that services both cities, as well as Acushnet, Dartmouth, Fairhaven, Freetown, Mattapoisett, Somerset, Swansea, and Westport. The twelve fixed-route bus lines that service Fall River depart from the Louis D. Pettine Transportation Center, which opened in 2013. Service to Providence, Tiverton, and Newport, Rhode Island is offered by the Rhode Island Public Transit Authority (RIPTA).

Intercity bus service to Boston and Hyannis is provided by Peter Pan, with connections available to the company's larger network via transfers.

Air
Fall River Municipal Airport, opened in 1951, served as a general aviation airport for small planes and commuter flights to the Cape and Islands for several decades. By the 1960s, the airport had fallen into a state of relative disrepair. it was closed on February 18, 1996, after the Federal Aviation Administration deemed it unsafe due to its proximity to the city's large landfill. Limited commercial service to the Cape and Islands, as well as general aviation, is available from New Bedford Regional Airport in nearby New Bedford, Massachusetts. Domestic and international commercial air service is available from T.F. Green Airport, located 13 miles west in Warwick, Rhode Island, and at Logan International Airport, located 45 miles north in Boston, Massachusetts.

Water
The Fall River Line Pier, located directly beneath the Braga Bridge, is a major port for commercial fishing and cargo shipping, handling imports from and to Cape Verde, the Azores, Brazil, Haiti, and the Dominican Republic. It has served as port-of-call for cruise ships, and serves as the terminus for a passenger ferry line connecting to Newport, Rhode Island. (Service to Block Island has been suspended since 2020 as a result of the COVID-19 pandemic). The pier also offers connections to freight rail via the Massachusetts Coastal Railroad.

Soccer
Fall River has a rich soccer history. The game was first introduced to the city in the 1880s by immigrants from Lancashire and Glasgow who worked in the local textile industry. In later decades, the arrival of immigrants from Portugal helped to sustain the game's popularity. Between 1888 and 1892, teams from Fall River won the American Cup for five straight years. One of these teams, the Fall River Rovers, also won the 1917 National Challenge Cup. The star and captain of the team was local-born Thomas Swords, who in 1916 captained the United States in their first official international.

During the 1920s and early 1930s, the Fall River Marksmen were one of the most successful soccer clubs in the United States and were American soccer champions on seven occasions. Another local club, Fall River F.C., were champions in 1932.

The Marksmen won the National Challenge Cup four times. Among their most notable players were Billy Gonsalves and Bert Patenaude, who were both raised in Fall River. Both played for the United States at the first ever soccer World Cup in 1930. Patenaude is also credited with scoring the first ever hat-trick in World Cup history. He scored all three goals in the United States' 3–0 victory over Paraguay.

During the 1940s, Ponta Delgada S.C. became one of the most successful amateur teams in the United States. In 1947 the team was selected to represent the United States at the North American soccer championship. In 1950, two of their local born players, Ed Souza and John Souza, played at the World Cup, helping the United States defeat England 1–0.

On January 18, 2011, Andrew Sousa was drafted by New England Revolution, becoming the first ever Fall River native to play in Major League Soccer.

In 2019, Fall River Football Club and Fall River Marksmen FC returned to the field after a long hiatus. Both clubs participated in the 1st annual Taça de Fall River, a Home & Away match series, with Fall River Football Club becoming the eventual winners.

Points of interest

 
 Battleship Cove, the world's largest historic naval ship exhibit, featuring the USS Massachusetts
 Lincoln Park Carousel, restored 1920 carousel, located at Battleship Cove
 Fall River Heritage State Park, the focal point of Fall River's waterfront
 The Marine Museum at Fall River
 Freetown-Fall River State Forest
 Kennedy Park, North Park and Ruggles Park, designed by Frederick Law Olmsted
 Lizzie Borden Bed and Breakfast Museum
 Maplecroft, home of Lizzie Borden from 1894 to her death in 1927
 Oak Grove Cemetery
 Barnard's Folly, a group of historic triple decker tenement houses located on North Main Street
 Granite Mills, two historic cotton textile mills located on Bedford Street

Notable people

 Lizzie Borden (1860–1927), tried and acquitted of the 1892 murder of father and step-mother and public speaking teacher in Fall River; is buried with them and the rest of their immediate family in Oak Grove Cemetery
 Nathaniel B. Borden (1801–1865), businessman and politician
 Colonel Richard Borden (1795–1874), mill owner and industrialist
 Dave Brinnel, musician, television producer, radio personality
 David Glendenning Cogan (1908–1993), ophthalmologist
 Jasiel Correia (born 1991), Democrat-politician; arrested twice on charges related to fraud and extortion while in office
 Morton Dean, television and radio anchor, news correspondent and author
 Diesel, born Mark Denis Lizotte, American-born Australian singer-songwriter and musician
 E. J. Dionne, journalist, political commentator
 Robert Dollard, first Attorney General of South Dakota
 Kristen Gilbert, serial killer nurse who murdered four patients
 Brandon Gomes, former Major League Baseball player and current Los Angeles Dodgers general manager
 Leslie Gourse, jazz writer, born here in 1939
 Hank the Angry Drunken Dwarf (Henry Joseph Nasiff Jr.), entertainer
 Chris Herren, professional basketball player (Denver Nuggets & Boston Celtics)
 Louie Howe, political advisor to President Franklin D. Roosevelt
 Thomas J. Hudner, Jr., Naval aviator and Medal of Honor recipient
 Sam Hyde, comedian, writer, and actor
 Napoleon A. L'Herault, lawyer and Minnesota state senators
 Emeril Lagasse, celebrity chef
 Tom Lawlor, professional mixed martial artist
 Marc Megna, American and Canadian football player
 Ernest Moniz, 13th U.S. Secretary of Energy
 John Moriarty, pianist, vocal coach, diction and repertoire professor, New England Conservatory of Music
 Bert Patenaude, professional soccer player, scored the first hat-trick in a World Cup match
 Irving Picard, attorney in the Madoff scandal
 Joe Raposo, songwriter for Sesame Street
 Kimberly Clark Saenz, convicted serial killer and former nurse
 Chris Santos, celebrity chef
 Ronald A. Sarasin, politician
 Winston Sharples, composer known for his work at RKO Radio Pictures and Paramount cartoons
 Andrew Sousa, professional soccer player
 George Stephanopoulos, Good Morning America co-host, born in Fall River
 Tecia Torres, professional mixed martial artist
 Susan H. Wixon (1839–1912), freethought writer, editor, feminist, educator

See also 
 List of mill towns in Massachusetts
 USS Fall River, 2 ships

References

External links

 Fall River official website
 Preservation Society of Fall River
 Beers, D.G. 1872 Atlas of Essex County Map of Massachusetts Plate 5. Click on the map for a very large image. Also see detailed map of 1872 Essex County Plate 7.
 Fall River History, Old Newspaper Articles, Genealogy

 
1670 establishments in Massachusetts
Cities in Bristol County, Massachusetts
Cities in Massachusetts
Eastern Nazarene College locations
History of the textile industry
Populated coastal places in Massachusetts
Populated places established in 1670
Portuguese-American culture in Massachusetts
Portuguese neighborhoods in the United States
Providence metropolitan area